The ADC Airdisco is a British V-8 aero engine that first ran in 1925.

Design and development
The 'Airdisco' was developed from the French Renault 70 hp aero engine by Frank Halford of the Aircraft Disposal Company, the main difference being the use of aluminium cylinder heads. Halford later used one bank of cylinders to create the Cirrus engine.

Applications
Avro 548A
Cierva Parnall Gyroplane
de Havilland DH.51
Royal Aircraft Factory S.E.5A

Survivors
A de Havilland DH.51 owned and operated by the Shuttleworth Collection at Old Warden, Bedfordshire remains airworthy and is powered by an original ADC Airdisco engine.

Specifications (Airdisco)

See also

References

Notes

Bibliography

 Lumsden, Alec. British Piston Engines and their Aircraft. Marlborough, Wiltshire: Airlife Publishing, 2003. .

External links

Airdisco Avro, Kings Cup entrant, Flight, July 1925

1920s aircraft piston engines
Airdisco